Webster Mulenga (born 27 June 1993) is a Zambian footballer who most recently played as a forward for Red Arrows F.C. and the Zambia national football team.

Career
Mulenga made his senior international debut on 13 June 2017 in a 2-1 victory over South Africa.

In September 2020, after two years with the club, Mulenga was released by Red Arrows F.C.

Career statistics

International

References

External links

1993 births
Living people
Zambian footballers
Zambia international footballers
Association football forwards
Nakambala Leopards F.C. players
Red Arrows F.C. players